Donovan Jerome Leitch (born August 16, 1967) is an English-born American actor, singer and former model. He is the son of the singer-songwriter Donovan and the brother of actress Ione Skye. He was a member of the hard rock band Camp Freddy, and was a founding member of neo-glam group Nancy Boy along with Jason Nesmith, the son of Michael Nesmith of The Monkees. As an actor, he is best known for portraying Paul Taylor in the 1988 remake of The Blob.

Career

Leitch appeared in the films Breakin' 2: Electric Boogaloo (1985), The In Crowd (1988), ...And God Created Woman (1988), The Blob (1988), Glory (1989, portraying Charles Fessenden Morse), Cutting Class (1989), Gas, Food Lodging (1992), Dark Horse (1992), Jack the Bear (1993), Cityscrapes: Los Angeles (1994), I Shot Andy Warhol (1996), One Night Stand (1997) and Love Kills (1998). Leitch was featured as the villain of the week, Malcolm Lagg, an underground fight club coordinator for metahumans in the Birds of Prey episode "Gladiatrix".

In 1986, he auditioned for the role of "Bill S. Preston Esquire" in Bill & Ted's Excellent Adventure being one of the final picks along with Keanu Reeves, Gary Riley and Matt Adler. The role ultimately went to Alex Winter, who initially read for the part of Ted "Theodore" Logan.

In the early 1990s, Leitch formed Nancy Boy, an alternative rock band with glam rock and Britpop influences. The band also featured guitarist Jason Nesmith, son of Michael Nesmith of The Monkees. The band released two albums, Promosexual in 1995 and Nancy Boy in 1996. Although their second album was issued on major label Elektra Records, it was not a success, and the band fell inactive after Nesmith left the lineup a few years later.

Personal life 
Leitch was born in London, the son of singer/songwriter Donovan and model Enid Karl (née Stulberger). He is the brother of actress Ione Skye. His parents separated when he was three and he was raised by his mother in the Hollywood Hills of California. His father is Scottish, of partial Irish descent. His mother was raised in The Bronx, New York City and is Jewish.

He married Scottish model Kirsty Hume on September 23, 1997. Their daughter, Violet Jean Leitch, was born March 21, 2004, at home in Los Angeles.
Leitch and Hume separated in 2011, and Hume filed for divorce in summer 2014.

Leitch proposed to actress Libby Mintz two months after Hume filed for divorce. He and Mintz had a son, Donovan Evers Leitch, on April 14, 2015, and were married in a ceremony in Los Angeles on October 3, 2015.

Filmography

Film

Television

References

External links

1967 births
Living people
English male film actors
English rock singers
English people of Irish descent
English people of Scottish descent
English male television actors
American male film actors
American male musicians
American rock singers
American people of Scottish descent
American male television actors
Male actors from London
Musicians from London
British emigrants to the United States
Musicians from Los Angeles
Male actors from Los Angeles
20th-century English male actors
21st-century English male actors
20th-century American male actors
21st-century American male actors
Camp Freddy members
Romo